Matthew Willis may refer to:
 Matt Willis (born 1983), UK musician
 Matt Willis (American football) (born 1984), American football player
 Matt Willis (1913–1989), American actor, known for The Return of the Vampire and other early movies